Medical Law Review  is published by Oxford University Press. It was first published in 1997 and publishes peer-reviewed scholarly articles, notes, reports, and book reviews. It is current edited by Hazel Biggs and Suzanne Ost.
A ranking of UK law journals based on statistical data from the 2001 Research Assessment Exercise places the Medical Law Review as the leading medical law journal. It is widely regarded as a leading medical law journal.

References

External links

British law journals
Law journals
Medical law
Quarterly journals
English-language journals
Medical law journals
Health law journals